Hawk Creek is a  tributary of the Minnesota River in Kandiyohi, Chippewa, and Renville counties, Minnesota, United States. It begins at the outlet of Foot Lake in Willmar and flows southwest, passing the cities of Raymond, Clara City, and Maynard.

One of Hawk Creek's tributaries is called the Chetamba Creek/River between Maynard, Sacred Heart, and Granite Falls.

"Hawk Creek" is an English translation of the native Sioux language name.

See also

List of rivers of Minnesota

References

Minnesota Watersheds
USGS Hydrologic Unit Map - State of Minnesota (1974)

Rivers of Minnesota
Rivers of Kandiyohi County, Minnesota
Rivers of Chippewa County, Minnesota
Rivers of Renville County, Minnesota